= Singaram =

Singaram is a village and a Railway station of Odisha state. It is located on Koraput-Rayagada Rail Link line.
